Andreas Schnider (born 3 December 1959) is an Austrian theologian, academic teacher, author, publisher, consultant and politician of the Austrian People's Party (ÖVP). He was the leader of the party's regional section Steirische Volkspartei in Styria from 2001 to 2010, and a member of the Bundesrat from 2002 to 2010. 

Schnider founded the Manumedia Schnider Verlag publishing house in 1989 which he later expanded to consulting functions. He has been professor at the Benedict XVI Philosophical-Theological University in Heiligenkreuz since 2006.

Education 
He studied theology at the Karl Franzens University in Graz, graduating as Mag. theol. in 1982. He received his doctorate in theology in 1985.

Teaching 
From 1982 to 1989, Schnider worked as a religion teacher at various grammar schools in Graz. From 1983 to 1989, he was also employed as a university assistant at the Institute for Catechetics and Religious Education at the Graz University. From 1989 to 2001, he was head of the Religious Education Institute ("Religionspädagogisches Institut") of the Diocese of Graz-Seckau. He has been professor for religious education and catechetics as well as for the university course in religious education at the Benedict XVI Philosophical-Theological University in Heiligenkreuz since 2006. He is active as a lecturer at various tertiary educational institutions. Subsequently, he was elected for a five-year term as chair of the new "Qualitätssicherungsrat für Pädagogen- und Pädagoginnenbildung" (QSR), supervising the quality of the education of pedagogues.

Publishing and consulting company 
In 1989, Schnider founded the publishing house Manumedia Schnider Verlag, which he expanded in 2001 to "Dr. Schnider's OG" for consulting, publishing and coaching, and further to "dr. schnider's eu" in 2005. Schnider is author, editor and publisher of numerous books.

Politics 
Schnider was in politics from 2001 to 2010. In January 2001, former provincial governor Waltraud Klasnic appointed him as provincial secretary of the Steirische Volkspartei in Graz, a post he held until 2006. In this function he not only advocated the possibility of marriage between homosexuals, but also demanded the right of child adoption for them. From 17 December 2002 Schnider also became a member of the Federal Council in the Austrian Parliament in Vienna, succeeding . He held this position until October 2010. Schnider was also president of the Austrian Academic Association (Österreichischer Akademikerbund) from 2010.

Private life 
Schnider is the father of three children and lives in Vienna and Graz.

References

External links 
 

University of Graz alumni
University of Vienna alumni
Austrian People's Party politicians
Members of the Federal Council (Austria)
Cartellverband members
Austrian publishers (people)

1959 births
Living people
People from Graz